is a Japanese former figure skater. He is the 2010 Ondrej Nepela Memorial champion, 2010 Asian Trophy champion, and 2013 Winter Universiade bronze medalist.

He began skating at the Kanagawa Ice Rink with his brother.

Programs

Competitive highlights

References

External links 

 

1991 births
Japanese male single skaters
Living people
Sportspeople from Yokohama
Universiade medalists in figure skating
Universiade bronze medalists for Japan
Competitors at the 2013 Winter Universiade